The Sacred Heart Cathedral or simply Cathedral of Maliana and more formally Cathedral of the Sacred Heart of Jesus, is a religious building affiliated with the Catholic Church which is located in the town of Maliana in Bobonaro district, near the border with Indonesia.

The Cathedral follows the Roman or Latin rite and serves as the seat of the diocese of Maliana (Dioecesis Malianensis or Diocese de Maliana) which was created in 2010 by bull "Missionalem Ecclesiae" of the Pope Benedict XVI.

It is under the pastoral responsibility of the Bishop Norberto Do Amaral.

See also
Roman Catholicism in East Timor
Sacred Heart Cathedral (disambiguation)

References

Roman Catholic cathedrals in East Timor
Maliana